Pitakotte East Grama Niladhari Division is a Grama Niladhari Division of the Sri Jayawardanapura Kotte Divisional Secretariat of Colombo District of Western Province, Sri Lanka. It has Grama Niladhari Division Code 522A.

1987 grenade attack in the Sri Lankan Parliament, Diyasaru Park, Sri Lankan Parliament Building, Parliament of Sri Lanka and Diyawanna Lake are located within, nearby or associated with Pitakotte East.

Pitakotte East is a surrounded by the Battaramulla South, Pahalawela, Madiwela, Mirihana North, Pitakotte and Ethulkotte Grama Niladhari Divisions.

Demographics

Ethnicity 

The Pitakotte East Grama Niladhari Division has a Sinhalese majority (91.2%). In comparison, the Sri Jayawardanapura Kotte Divisional Secretariat (which contains the Pitakotte East Grama Niladhari Division) has a Sinhalese majority (84.8%)

Religion 

The Pitakotte East Grama Niladhari Division has a Buddhist majority (80.6%). In comparison, the Sri Jayawardanapura Kotte Divisional Secretariat (which contains the Pitakotte East Grama Niladhari Division) has a Buddhist majority (77.1%)

Gallery

References 

Grama Niladhari Divisions of Kotte Divisional Secretariat